The Cochrane Generals are a Junior "B" Ice Hockey team based in Cochrane, Alberta, Canada. They are members of the South Division of the Heritage Junior B Hockey League (HJHL). They will play their home games at Cochrane Arena for the 2022-2023 season.

History  

The Cochrane Generals played in the CAJHL before the HJHL, in the CAJHL they were the 1988-89 South Division Champions. They are the 2007-08 and 2008-09 HJHL Champions. Since then they have been 2015-2016 HJHL South Division Champions, in 2016-17, the team won the HJHL South division and the 2021-22 North Division Champions as well as a silver medal at the Alberta Jr. B hockey Championships in 2017 and 2022.

Season-by-season record  

Note: GP = Games played, W = Wins, L = Losses, T = Ties, OTL = Overtime Losses, Pts = Points, GF = Goals for, GA = Goals against, PIM = Penalties in minutes

Russ Barnes Trophy
Alberta Jr B Provincial Championships

Awards and trophies  
HJHL Championship
2007–08, 2008–09
Division Champions

 1988-89, 2007-2008, 2008-2009, 2015-2016, 2016-2017, 2021-2022

Provincial Medals

 2016-2017, 2021-2022

See also
List of ice hockey teams in Alberta

External links
Official website of the Cochrane Generals

Ice hockey teams in Alberta